The 1985 Penn Quakers football team represented the University of Pennsylvania in the 1985 NCAA Division I-AA football season.

Schedule

References

Penn
Penn Quakers football seasons
Ivy League football champion seasons
Penn Quakers football